Edward M. Sears (born April 6, 1977) is an American actor, known for his roles as Richard Patrick Woolsley on the TNT legal drama series Raising the Bar, Patrick on the first season of FX anthology horror drama American Horror Story (retroactively titled Murder House), Dr. Austin Langham on the Showtime period drama series Masters of Sex, and DC Comics supervillain Hunter Zolomon / Zoom on The Flash.

Early life and education
Sears was born in Washington, D.C., and raised in Chevy Chase, Maryland. He attended high school at the Landon School in Bethesda, MD. Sears played varsity football for the University of Maryland, but transferred and graduated from the University of Virginia with a degree in business management in 1999.

Career
Sears' business career in New York was put on hold as he won a role on his first audition, with a two-year contract role on the daytime series One Life to Live. Then, after several appearances on the Law & Order franchise and Whoopi, he attended the William Esper Studio. This training led to comedy stints on the Late Show with David Letterman and Late Night with Conan O'Brien.

He co-starred on the TNT original series Raising the Bar portraying public defender Richard Patrick Woolsley.

Sears appeared in Joss Whedon's Dollhouse, the Lifetime original film The Client List, and as Thomas Cole in The Defenders.

In 2013, Sears joined the cast of the Showtime drama Masters of Sex, about the work of Masters and Johnson. From 2015 to 2016, Sears had been cast in the second season in a recurring role of The CW's DC Comics television series The Flash, initially introduced as Jay Garrick, until it was revealed that his character was actually Hunter Zolomon / Zoom. In 2017, he starred as Keith Mullins in 24: Legacy.

In 2020, Sears appeared as a guest on the Studio 60 on the Sunset Strip marathon fundraiser episode of The George Lucas Talk Show.

Personal life
Sears married actress Milissa Skoro on October 5, 2013. In his free time he surfs and plays ice hockey. He has two brothers, Christian and Ricky, and a sister Dana.

His great-grandfather won a gold medal in the 1912 Olympics for pistol shooting, and his aunt won a bronze medal in the 1956 Olympics for the 100-yard butterfly.

Filmography

References

External links

 

1977 births
21st-century American male actors
American male film actors
American male soap opera actors
American male television actors
Living people
Male actors from Maryland
Male actors from Washington, D.C.
People from Chevy Chase, Maryland
McIntire School of Commerce alumni